Schneidereria pistaciicola is a moth of the family Gelechiidae. It is found in Tadjikistan, Uzbekistan, Turkmenistan, Iran and Iraq.

There are two to three generations per year.

The larvae feed on Pistacia mutica.

References

Moths described in 1955
Litini